Gross may refer to:

Finance 
Gross Cash Registers, a defunct UK company with a high profile in the 1970s
Gross (economics), is the total income before deducting expenses

Science and measurement 
Gross (unit), a counting unit equal to 144 items
Gross weight
 Gross heating value, see Heat of combustion

Places
Gross, Illinois, an unincorporated community
Gross, Kansas, an unincorporated community
Gross mine, a gold mine in Russia
Gross, Nebraska, a village
Gross Hills, Ellsworth Land, Antarctica
33800 Gross, an asteroid

Other uses
Gross (surname)
In golf, the gross score is the number of strokes taken before accounting for any handicap allowances
"In gross", legally associated with a legal person as opposed to a piece of land; as in:
 Easement in gross as opposed to easement appurtenant
 Hereditary in gross service, as opposed to serjeanty
 Profit in gross as opposed to profit appurtenant
 Villein in gross (tied to the lord) as opposed to villein regardant (tied to the manor)

See also

Gros (disambiguation)
Grosz (disambiguation)